Events from the 1110s in England.

Incumbents
Monarch – Henry I

Events
 1110
 Roger of Salisbury creates the exchequer as a separate governmental department.
 Royal park at Woodstock walled to allow for hunting and keeping exotic animals.
 1111
 Robert of Shrewsbury leads a rebellion in Normandy; Henry I launches a military campaign in response.
 1112
 Robert of Shrewsbury captured, ending the rebellion.
Count of Anjou agrees to do homage to Henry I.
 1113
 Treaty of Gisors: France recognises English rule over Maine and Brittany.
 Scottish noble David, Prince of the Cumbrians, marries Anglo-Saxon heiress Maud, Countess of Huntingdon.
 1114
 7 January – Matilda, daughter of Henry I, marries Henry V, Holy Roman Emperor.
 April – Ralph d'Escures enthroned as Archbishop of Canterbury.
 Summer – Henry I invades Wales.
 Roger of Salisbury introduces the first pipe rolls, as a record of exchequer accounts.
 1115
 Henry I creates his nephew Stephen count of Mortain in Normandy.
 1116
 Henry I launches a military campaign against France, Anjou, and Flanders.
 A fire destroys Peterborough Cathedral.
 1117
 3 May – Merton Priory in Surrey is consecrated.
 1118
 Peace with Flanders agreed.
 Reconstruction of Peterborough Cathedral begins.
 1119
 June – Henry I's son, William Adelin, marries Matilda of Anjou, securing peace with Anjou.
 20 August – Henry I defeats Louis VI of France at the Battle of Bremule in Normandy, ending the campaign in France.
 19 September – A severe earthquake hits Gloucestershire and Warwickshire.
 Robert de Brus, 1st Lord of Annandale, founds Gisborough Priory and grants the church of St Hilda of "Middleburg" (Middlesbrough) to Whitby Abbey.
 Construction of Leeds Castle (Kent) in stone begins.

Births
 1110
Aelred of Rievaulx, abbot (died 1167)
 1111
Henry of Blois, bishop of Winchester (died 1171)
 Josceline de Bohon, religious leader (died 1184)
 1115
Gilbert de Clare, 2nd Earl of Hertford (died 1153)
 1116
Roger de Clare, 3rd Earl of Hertford (died 1173)
 1118
 21 December – Thomas Becket, Archbishop of Canterbury (died 1170)

Deaths
 1118
 1 May – Matilda of Scotland, Queen of Henry I (born c. 1080, Scotland)
 5 June – Robert de Beaumont, 1st Earl of Leicester, (born 1049, Normandy)
 1119
 20 June – Henry de Beaumont, 1st Earl of Warwick

References